Rokan Hulu is a regency (kabupaten) of Riau, Indonesia. It is located on the island of Sumatra. Rokan Hulu Regency was created as a result of the division of Kampar Regency, of which it was previously the western half. The new Regency was established on 12 October 1999 under Law No. 53 of 1999 and Law No. 11 of 2003 on changes to Law Decree No. 53 of 1999, which is reinforced by the Constitutional Court Decision No. 010 / PUU-1/2004, dated 26 August 2004. It mainly occupies the upper part of the catchment area of the Rokan River, and has an area of 7,588.13 km². It had 474,843 inhabitants at the 2010 Census and 561,385 at the 2020 Census, comprising 286,928 male and 274,457 female. The administrative centre of the regency is located at Pasir Pengaraian.

Administrative districts 

The regency is divided into sixteen districts (kecamatan), listed below with their populations at the 2010 Census and 2020 Census. The table also includes the locations of the district administrative centres, and the number of villages (rural desa and urban kelurahan) in each district.

References

External links
 Official site

Regencies of Riau